Elad Koren is a former Israeli footballer who played in Maccabi Netanya, Maccabi Haifa, Maccabi Ironi Ashdod and Maccabi Herzliya.

In 1985, he made his debut in the senior side of Maccabi Netanya while only 16 years old.

After retiring from his professional career as a football player, Elad turn into the high-tech industry and claimed up the corporate ladder where he is now acting as a Vice President leading complex projects in the telecommunication industry.
 
in addition, Elad has been perfecting his knowledge and skills in photography becoming a seasoned nature and wildlife photographer. Elad manages through his personal journey of self-exploration to bring his photos to life by capturing the emotional aspect in each frame. He truly believes that nature and wild-life photography are all about being in the moment and conveying it in a truthful yet alluring manner. He uses his camera like a painter uses his brush and by doing so he is able to portray the unique and extraordinary nature of his subjects. 
 
Elad photographs animal life, landscapes, and people in their natural habitats and he does it all with great splendor by using exceptional composition, natural light and precision.
His photos can be seen in galleries around the world (Paris, Barcelona, Milan, Israel and more.) His work is being sold to private collectors, interior designers and can be seen decorating high-class restaurants, law offices, and private homes. visit his homepage to see and purchase is artwork - Elad Koren Photography

Honours
Israel State Cup 
Winner (1) 1992–93
Championships
Runner-up (1): 1987–88
Toto Cup
Runner-up (2): 1986-87, 1988–89

References

1968 births
Living people
Israeli Jews
Israeli footballers
Maccabi Netanya F.C. players
Maccabi Haifa F.C. players
Maccabi Ironi Ashdod F.C. players
Maccabi Herzliya F.C. players
Footballers from Netanya
Liga Leumit players
Association football defenders